Khorasani Arabs are Iranian Arabs who are descended from the Arabs who immigrated to the Khorasan area of Iran during the Abbasid Caliphate (750−1258). Unlike the Arabs of Iran's Khuzestan Province in the southwestern part of the country, who are direct descendants of the ancient population of the area, the Khorasani Arabs are descended from actual Arab migrants. According to a 2013 article in peer-reviewed journal Iran and the Caucasus, the Khorasani Arabs, numbering , are "already almost totally Persianised".

Most Khorasani Arabs belong to the tribes of Shaybani, Zangooyi, Mishmast, Khozaima, and Azdi. Khorasan Arabs are Persian speakers, and only a few speak Khorasani Arabic as their native language. The cities of Birjand, Mashhad, and Nishapur are home to large groups of Khorasani Arabs.

According to Ibn Al-Athir, the Arabic conquerors settled about 50,000 Arab families in to Iranian Khorasan, modern day Northern Afghanistan and southern Turkmenistan, but the number is definitely exaggerated.

See also
 Iranian Arabs
 Khorasani Arabic

Sources

Persian and German Wikipedia
Linguistic Convergence and Areal Diffusion: Case Studies from Iranian. By Éva Ágnes Csató, Bo Isaksson, Carina Jahani. Page 162.
Khorasani Arabic

Arab diaspora in Asia
 
Medieval Khorasan